Jakub Suchánek (born November 16, 1984) is a Czech professional ice hockey defenceman playing for Motor České Budějovice of the Czech Extraliga.

Suchánek played the early part of his career in the Czech lower leagues as well as spells in the 1st Czech Republic Hockey League for HC Slovan Ústečtí Lvi, HC Olomouc, Sportovní Klub Kadaň and HC Most. He also played five seasons in France between 2009 and 2014, spending three seasons with Rapaces de Gap and two with Étoile Noire de Strasbourg.

Suchánek made his Czech Extraliga debut with HC Dukla Jihlava during the 2017–18 season at the age of 33. The team were relegated to the Chance Liga, though Suchánek did manage a return to the Extraliga on loan at HC Litvínov. On May 1, 2019, he joined Motor České Budějovice of the Chance Liga where they earned promotion to the Czech Extraliga.

References

External links

1984 births
Living people
Czech ice hockey defencemen
HC Dukla Jihlava players
Étoile Noire de Strasbourg players
HC Litvínov players
HC Most players
Motor České Budějovice players
HC Olomouc players
People from Tábor
Rapaces de Gap players
HC Slovan Ústečtí Lvi players
Sportovní Klub Kadaň players
HC Tábor players
Sportspeople from the South Bohemian Region
Rytíři Kladno players
Czech expatriate ice hockey people
Czech expatriate sportspeople in France
Expatriate ice hockey players in France